Rachel Shelley (born 25 August 1969) is an English actress and model. She is best known for playing Helena Peabody in the Showtime series The L Word and Elizabeth Russell in the Oscar-nominated Bollywood epic Lagaan.

Early life
Rachel Irene Shelley was born on 25 August 1969 in Wiltshire, England, United Kingdom, and was brought up primarily in London. She is the youngest of four children, she has an older sister and two older brothers. Shelley spent three years in Malta as a child before attending school in Huntingdon. After graduating from the University of Sheffield with a B.A. Hons in English and Drama in 1992, she joined a local theatre company in Edinburgh and set up a community theatre company in Sheffield before moving to London to further her acting career.

Career
Shelley is perhaps best known for playing Helena Peabody in the Showtime series The L Word. Other parts include Elizabeth Russell in the Oscar-nominated Hindi film Lagaan in 2001, and the beauty whose tragic loss drives Charles Castle mad in the 1997 film Photographing Fairies. In 2012 and early 2013, she played the recurring role of Yvonne Rippon, a police superintendent who had a relationship with established character Nick Jordan, in popular BBC medical drama Casualty. Shelley left the series on 19 January 2013.

Apart from acting, Shelley has written articles for The Guardian and DIVA Magazine.

Personal life
Shelley lives in Notting Hill, London with her partner since 1995, Matthew Parkhill, who is a TV writer, director and producer. They have a daughter named Eden, born 8 September 2009.

Filmography

Television

References

External links

1969 births
Living people
Actors from Swindon
Alumni of the University of Sheffield
English film actresses
English television actresses
British expatriates in Malta
Actresses from Wiltshire